The 1988 Pacific-10 Conference men's basketball tournament was played March 10–13 at McKale Center in Tucson, Arizona, on the University of Arizona campus. Both finalists made their first appearances in the title game, the first final to feature both top seeds. The champion of the tournament was host Arizona, which received the Pac-10's automatic bid to the NCAA tournament. The Most Outstanding Player was Sean Elliott 

This was the tournament's second edition and all ten teams participated.

Bracket

Asterisk denotes overtime period.

Tournament Notes
 Arizona's 26 point win (93-67) over Oregon State was the largest margin of victory for the final game in Pac-10/12 Tournament history.
 Arizona's 93 points is still a record for the most points scored in the Pac-10/12 tournament final game.
 #10 Washington and #9 Cal each upset their opponents early on to be the first winners for their respective seeds in Pac-10 Tournament history.
 A current record high FG% for a game of 68.3% was set by Cal vs. USC (28-of-41).
 A current record of most points for a tournament was set by Arizona, (3 games).
 A current record FG% for this tournament of 79.1% was set by Isaac Austin of Arizona State, (19-of-24, 3 games, min 15 made).

All tournament team
Sean Elliott, Arizona
Anthony Cook, Arizona
Steve Kerr, Arizona
Todd Lichti, Stanford
Gary Payton, Oregon State

References

Pac-12 Conference men's basketball tournament
Tournament
Pacific-10 Conference men's basketball tournament
Pacific-10 Conference men's basketball tournament